Randu Lokam is a 1977 Indian Malayalam film, directed by J. Sasikumar and produced by Hari Pothan. The film stars Prem Nazir, Sharada, Jayabharathi and M. G. Soman in the lead roles. The film has musical score by G. Devarajan. The film is a remake of 1971 Tamil film Savaale Samali.

Cast
 
Prem Nazir as Surendran
Sharada as Santha
Jayabharathi as Radha
M. G. Soman as Balan
Jayan 
KPAC Lalitha as Savithri
Kaviyoor Ponnamma
Adoor Bhasi as Kochu Kurup
Jose Prakash as Gopala Kuruppu
Manavalan Joseph 
Bahadoor as Govindan
Kunchan as Kuttan
Meena 
Usharani

Soundtrack
The music was composed by G. Devarajan and the lyrics were written by Yusufali Kechery.

References

External links
 

1977 films
1970s Malayalam-language films
Malayalam remakes of Tamil films
Films directed by J. Sasikumar